Sir Alan Campbell (born 8 July 1957) is a British Labour Party politician who has been the Member of Parliament (MP) for Tynemouth since 1997. He was appointed as Chief Whip of the Labour Party in May 2021.

Early life
Campbell was born in Consett and went to Blackfyne Grammar School in the town before attending Lancaster University where he was awarded a BA in politics. He then gained a PGCE at the University of Leeds, before finishing his education at Newcastle Polytechnic with an MA in history. He began his career as a history teacher at Whitley Bay High School in 1981; after eight years there became head of the sixth form at Hirst High School, Ashington, then head of department, where he remained until he was elected to the House of Commons.

Parliamentary career
He contested the Conservative-held marginal constituency of Tynemouth at the 1997 general election where he defeated Martin Callanan by 11,273 votes. He made his maiden speech on 2 June 1997. Following his election, Campbell was a member of the public accounts select committee for the duration of his first parliament. After the 2001 general election he became the Parliamentary Private Secretary (PPS) to the Minister of State at the Cabinet Office Gus Macdonald, and in 2003 became the PPS to Adam Ingram at the Ministry of Defence. He entered the government of Tony Blair after the 2005 general election as an assistant whip, being promoted to a full whip in 2006. On 5 October 2008, Campbell was promoted to the Home Office as a Parliamentary Under-Secretary of State.

At the 2010 general election, Campbell was one of the very few Labour MPs re-elected by an increased majority. After Ed Miliband was appointed party leader, he was appointed Deputy Chief Whip of the Labour Party, serving under Rosie Winterton as Chief Whip.

He became the new Chief Whip of the Labour Party in the May 2021 shadow cabinet reshuffle.

Voting record
In Parliament, Campbell has not broken the Labour Party whip and voted in favour of committing UK troops to the Iraq war. As a member of the government, he supported proposals for foundation hospitals, top-up fees for students, identity cards, and renewing Trident missiles. 

With regard to issues on which there was no whip, Campbell supported equal gay rights, legal restrictions on hunting foxes with hounds, and a partially elected House of Lords.

He opposed raising the tuition fee cap to £9,000 and the government's education proposals on academies and free schools.

Expenses

Campbell was not found to have misappropriated any funds by the Legg inquiry in 2010.

Personal life 
He married Jayne Lamont in August 1991 in Newcastle upon Tyne and they have a son, James (born September 1995), a daughter, Emily (born September 1993). 

In May 2000, he had an operation at Newcastle General Hospital to remove a benign tumour from the top of his spine.

He was knighted as Knight Bachelor in the 2019 New Year Honours List.

References

External links
 Alan Campbell MP official site

 Alan Campbell Profile at New Statesman
  IPSA -The Independent Parliamentary Standards Authority

Labour Party (UK) MPs for English constituencies
UK MPs 1997–2001
UK MPs 2001–2005
UK MPs 2005–2010
UK MPs 2010–2015
UK MPs 2015–2017
Alumni of the University of Leeds
Alumni of Lancaster University
Alumni of Furness College, Lancaster
Alumni of Northumbria University
1957 births
Living people
People from Consett
People educated at Consett Grammar School
Members of the Privy Council of the United Kingdom
UK MPs 2017–2019
Knights Bachelor
Politicians awarded knighthoods
UK MPs 2019–present